The Union Pacific Center at 1400 Douglas Street is one of  downtown Omaha, Nebraska's newest high-rise buildings. It houses the headquarters of the Union Pacific Railroad and its parent company, the Union Pacific Corporation.  It officially opened in June 2004 and rises 317 ft (97 m) making it the third tallest building in Omaha.

References

See also
Economy of Omaha, Nebraska
List of tallest buildings in Omaha, Nebraska

Skyscraper office buildings in Omaha, Nebraska
Properties of the Union Pacific Railroad
Rail transportation in Nebraska
Headquarters in the United States
Office buildings completed in 2004
2004 establishments in Nebraska
Gensler buildings